Mighty Switch Force! 2 is a puzzle platformer developed and published by WayForward Technologies for the Nintendo 3DS. It is the fourth game in WayForward's Mighty series and the sequel to 2011's Mighty Switch Force!. The game was released on the Nintendo eShop on June 13, 2013 in North America and in the PAL regions on June 27, 2013. The game was later released for the Wii U in October 2013. A puzzle game using similar elements and assets, Mighty Switch Force! Hose It Down!, was released for iOS on February 12, 2015 and for Microsoft Windows on June 4, 2015.

Plot
The "Galactic Fire Brigade" has issued a code red: Plant Land is spontaneously combusting and everything is catching ablaze. Patrica Wagon must help as a "cybernetic firefighter", using the issued Infinity Dousing Apparatus, and rescue the Hooligan Sisters, who have been reformed since their capture, and are stuck in the infernos. At the same time, HQ has picked up cries of a distressed infant dubbed the "Ugly Secret Baby", or, "U.S.B". The "Rapid Sparkle Transmission System" usually used to extrapolate people was made for use on adults, so Patrica must find an alternative transport means (she achieves this by kicking the babies off screen, in-game).

Gameplay

Gameplay follows a similar premise to the previous game in which players assume the role of Patricia Wagon, who is now a firefighter that must rescue the Hooligan Sisters of the last game from blazing fires. Like the previous game, players are tasked with using Patricia's ability to push blocks in and out of the foreground in order to rescue the Hooligan Sisters and reach the extraction point as quickly as possible. This time around, Patricia's blaster from the previous game has been replaced by a new dousing apparatus that shoots a spray of water, which can be used to defeat enemies and put out fires. This new mechanic adds various new types of blocks to the mix, such as mud blocks that must be dissolved with water, pipe blocks that redirect the spray of water and wooden blocks that must be burned in order to destroy. Along with par times that the player may attempt to beat, each level also contains a hidden "U.S.B" baby they may try to locate.

Reception

Mighty Switch Force! 2 received "average" reviews on both platforms according to the review aggregation website Metacritic. Destructoid praised the gameplay of the 3DS version but lamented its short length, a fault shared by the game's predecessor.

Mighty Switch Force! Hose It Down!

Mighty Switch Force! Hose It Down! is a puzzle video game developed by WayForward Technologies, originally released for iOS on February 12, 2015, and later ported for Microsoft Windows via Steam on June 4, 2015. It is the first spin-off in the Mighty series and it was made using the same elements, assets and music as Mighty Switch Force! 2.

Gameplay
The gameplay is inspired by classic puzzle games like Pipe Mania. The players have to order a set number of various directional pipe blocks, that are given at every stage around the playfield, in order to redirect the water fired by Patricia's dousing apparatus so it can put down fire blocks and dissolve mud blocks. There are also certain levels where a reformed Hooligan Sister is trapped somewhere around the level and the player is tasked to put down the flames and to open a path using the pipe blocks so that she can escape. Each level also has par times that the player may attempt to beat.

Reception

The iOS version received "mixed" reviews according to Metacritic. Gamezebo praised the gameplay and feel of the iOS version. Criticism was aimed at the repetition of some levels in order to get the par times and the idea of having to pay an extra dollar in order to unlock more stages.

References

External links
 Official site
 Soundtrack
 
 

2013 video games
Nintendo 3DS eShop games
Wii U eShop games
Puzzle video games
Platform games
Video games scored by Jake Kaufman
Video games developed in the United States
Video games featuring female protagonists
Video game sequels
Video games about firefighting
WayForward games
Single-player video games